Sieversia is a genus of flowering plants of the family Rosaceae. It is also in the subfamily Rosoideae, and tribe Colurieae. 

Its native range is the Russian Far East (within the federal subjects of Kamchatka, Khabarovsk, Magadan, Primorye and Sakhalin including the Kuril Islands) to Japan and the Aleutian Islands.

The genus name of Sieversia is in honour of Johann August Carl Sievers (1762–1795), a German-born botanist who explored Central Asia, Siberia, and other Asian regions of the Russian Empire. It was first described and published in Mag. Neuesten Entdeck. Gesammten Naturk. Ges. Naturf. Freunde Berlin Vol.5 on page 397 in 1811.

Known species
According to Kew;

References 

Rosaceae genera
Colurieae
Plants described in 1811
Flora of the Russian Far East
Flora of Japan
Flora of the Aleutian Islands
Taxa named by Carl Ludwig Willdenow